Yambio Airport is an airport serving Yambio in South Sudan.

Location
Yambio Airport  is located in Yambio County in Gbudwe, in the town of Yambio, in the southwestern part of South Sudan, near the International borders with the Democratic Republic of the Congo and the Central African Republic. The airport is located just outside town to the northeast of the central business district along the Juba high-way.

The geographic coordinates of this airport are: 4° 34' 12.00"N, 28° 25' 320.02"E (Latitude: 4.57000; Longitude: 28.42556).

Overview
Yambio Airport is a small civilian that serves the town of Yambio and surrounding communities. The airport does not yet receive regular scheduled airline service, though chartered airlines fly to and from the airport. The airport is being operated by both Civil Aviation Authority of South Sudan and United Nations Mission In South Sudan (UNMISS).

Flights to Yambio 

 Eagle air
 Kush air.
 Golden wings.
 South Supreme airlines.
 Mission Aviation Fellowship (MAF).

See also
 Yambio
 Western Equatoria
 Equatoria
 List of airports in South Sudan

References

External links
 Location of Yambio Airport At Google Maps

 http://www.mirayafm.org/index.php/south-sudan-news/8382-plane-crashes-in-yambio
 http://aviation-safety.net/database/record.php?id=20120502-0
 http://www.sudantribune.com/South-Sudan-ex-minister-survive,42483
 http://www.slobodnaevropa.org/archive/news/latest/500/500.html?id=24573863 (Bosnian)

Airports in South Sudan
Western Equatoria
Equatoria